Ngapiki Hakaraia (4 May 1888–9 November 1969) was a New Zealand  religious founder. Of Māori descent, she identified with the Nga Rauru and Ngati Apa iwi. She was born in Kai Iwi, Wanganui, New Zealand on 4 May 1888.

References

1888 births
1969 deaths
Ngā Rauru people
Ngāti Awa people
New Zealand Māori religious leaders